Bokyi may refer to:

Bokyi people
Bokyi language
Ivan Bokyi (1942–2020), Ukrainian journalist and politician

See also
 
 Bokyi (surname)